Weener is a town in the district of Leer, in Lower Saxony, Germany. It is situated near the border with the Netherlands, on the river Ems. The towns population is at 15,654, making it the largest town of the region Rheiderland. It has a railway and autobahn connection to Groningen, Netherlands, Emden and Bremen.

The city was first mentioned in a monastery's records in 951.

Town

Division of the town
The town of Weener consists of 9 districts:
 Weener
 Kirchborgum
 Diele
 Vellage / Halte
 Stapelmoor
 Holthusen
 Weenermoor / Möhlenwarf
 St. Georgiwold
 Beschotenweg

Neighbouring communities
In the district of Leer:
 Bunde
 Leer
 Jemgum
 Westoverledingen

In the district of Emsland:
 Papenburg
 Rhede

Politics

Mayor
2006–2014: Wilhelm Dreesmann
2014–2021: Ludwig Sonnenberg
2021–incumbent: Heiko Abbas

Town Council

The last election to the town council took place in 2006:

 SPD = 53,0%, 17 seats
 CDU = 19,6%, 6 seats
 UWG = 19,0%, 6 seats
 Grüne = 5,6%, 2 seats
 FDP = 1,9%, 1 seat

Two members of the SPD group have split and form a single group in the council today.

International relations

Weener is twinned with:=
 Eurajoki in Finland
 Les Pieux in France

Demographics
Statistics are as of December 31 of each year:
 1980 – 14.115
 1985 – 14.245
 1990 – 14.320
 1995 – 14.831
 2000 – 15.338
 2001 – 15.406
 2002 – 15.534
 2003 – 15.625
 2004 – 15.666
 2005 – 15.602

Climate
Weener is in a temperate climate zone, influenced by the North Sea. During the summer the temperatures are lower compared to the rest of Germany, in winter the temperatures are higher than the other regions.

References

External links
  

Towns and villages in East Frisia
Leer (district)
Rheiderland